Contentful is a headless content management system (CMS), founded in 2013 in Berlin, Germany by Sascha Konietzke and Paolo Negri. The company and the platform are both called Contentful. As of June 2021, the company is headquartered in San Francisco, California, with offices in Denver, Colorado and Berlin.

History 
The company was founded in 2013 and released the first beta of its software platform that same year. A previous version of the platform was named "Storageroom." While the company often shies away from the terms "headless" and content management system, it is widely considered a headless CMS platform.

In 2018, the company raised a series D round of financing of $35.5 million  from OMERS, Benchmark, Balderton Capital, General Catalyst, Sapphire Ventures and the venture arm of Customer relationship management software company Salesforce.

In November 2019, Steven Sloan became CEO of Contentful, leaving cloud computing company Twilio and replacing cofounder Konietzke. In 2019, CB Insights, in an article in The New York Times, predicted that Contentful would become a startup unicorn, valued at more than one billion USD.

In June 2020, Contentful raised a series E round of financing of $80 million from venture capital funds Sapphire Ventures, General Catalyst and Salesforce Ventures.

In March 2021, Contentful created an online marketplace for third-party apps as well as apps built by the company, all using the Contentful platform. At the same time, the company made its APIs publicly available to promote the creation of more apps.

In July 2021, Contentful raised a series F round of financing of $175 million led by the private equity arm of the hedge fund Tiger Global at a valuation of $3 billion.

Clients 
Notable Contentful clients include IKEA, Jack in the Box, the British Museum, Spotify, Red Bull, Twilio and Urban Outfitters.

References 

Content management systems
German companies established in 2013
Companies based in San Francisco